Dog Borstal is a BBC series produced from 6 March 2006 to 9 December 2008, where three dog trainers dealt with particularly poorly-behaved dogs. It was directed by Jacqui Farnham and Carolyn Davies, and starred, among others, Lynne Davis, Mic Martin, Eleanor Graham, and Guy Oliver-Watts.

Notes

External links 
 

2006 British television series debuts
2008 British television series endings
Television shows about dogs
BBC high definition shows
BBC reality television shows
2000s British reality television series
English-language television shows